Bill Nalder (born 14 August 1952) is a former Australian rules footballer who played with Richmond in the Victorian Football League (VFL).

Notes

External links 

Bill Nalder's playing statistics from The VFA Project

Living people
1952 births
Australian rules footballers from Victoria (Australia)
Richmond Football Club players
Preston Football Club (VFA) players